Steven Rutger Jules van Randwijck (born August 27, 1969 in Washington, D.C., United States) is a former field hockey midfielder, who competed for the United States and finished twelfth with the national squad at the 1996 Summer Olympics in Atlanta. He grew up in the Netherlands, and played club hockey for HC Klein Zwitserland from The Hague.

References
 USA Field Hockey

External links
 

1969 births
Living people
Van Randwijck
Dutch emigrants to the United States
Dutch male field hockey players
Male field hockey midfielders
Van Randwijck
Field hockey players at the 1996 Summer Olympics
Van Randwijck
HC Klein Zwitserland players